is a series of Japanese cover albums and concerts produced by Walt Disney Japan. Beginning in 2012, it features Japanese-language versions of Disney songs performed by voice actors of anime series. After a five-year hiatus, the project was later revived as a series of yearly concerts in 2018 under the title Disney Koe no Ōji-sama Voice Stars.

History

2012-2014: Initial music project

In January 2012, Walt Disney Japan announced that a cover album titled Disney Date: Koe no Ōji-sama would be released on February 22, 2012, featuring Japanese-language versions of songs from various Disney films. The songs on the album were performed by voice actors Hiroshi Kamiya, Kenichi Suzumura, Jun Fukuyama, Takahiro Sakurai, Tomokazu Sugita, Hikaru Midorikawa, Toshiyuki Morikawa, Tomokazu Seki, Miyu Irino, and Koichi Yamadera. A second cover album titled Disney Koe no Ōji-sama Dai-ni Shō: Love Stories was released on September 19, 2012. Seki, Kamiya, Sakurai, Midorikawa, and Yamadera returned to perform, with new singers including voice actors Akira Ishida, Nobuhiko Okamoto, and Ryōtarō Okiayu. A third cover album, Disney Koe no Ōji-sama: Tokyo Disney Resort 30 Shūnen Kinen Shū was released on March 27, 2013 to celebrate the 30th anniversary of Tokyo Disney Resort. Returning voice actors to the project included Okiayu, Kamiya, Midorikawa, and Yamadera, with new singers including voice actors Daisuke Ono, Yuki Kaji, Junichi Suwabe, Takuma Terashima, and Kohsuke Toriumi. A compilation album titled Disney Koe no Ōji-sama All Stars was released on November 5, 2014.

2018-present: Voice Stars revival

In 2018, a new series of cover albums were announced under the umbrella title Disney Koe no Ōji-sama Voice Stars. The first album, Disney Koe no Ōji-sama Voice Stars Dream Selection releasing on September 29, 2018. In addition, a concert titled Koe no Ōji-sama: Disney Voice Stars Dream Live 2019 took place on June 9, 2019 in Chiba. Voice actors participating in the album and the concert included Kaito Ishikawa, Yuto Uemura, Takuya Eguchi, Shunsuke Takeuchi, Kensho Ono, Takuya Satō, Tasuku Hatanaka, Wataru Hatano, Natsuki Hanae, Satoshi Hino, Tomoaki Maeno, and Daiki Yamashita.

On the day of the concert, another installment titled Disney Koe no Ōji-sama Voice Stars Dream Selection II was announced, with the cover album releasing on September 25, 2019. The new cast consisted of voice actors Shintarō Asanuma, Kōhei Amasaki, Subaru Kimura, Shinnosuke Tachibana, Makoto Furukawa, Toshiki Masuda, Taku Yashiro, and Yoshitaka Yamaya, with the addition of 2.5D musical stage actors Yoshihiko Aramaki, Ren Ozawa, Akira Takano, and Shohei Hashimoto. Disney Koe no Ōji-sama Voice Stars Dream Selection II charted at #4 on the Oricon Weekly Albums Ranking on its first week of release. To promote the album, Kimura, Takano, and Aramaki performed on Music Fair on September 27, 2019. The Voice Stars Dream Selection II cast's concert, titled Koe no Ōji-sama: Disney Voice Stars Dream Live 2020, was scheduled to take place on July 12 and August 23, 2020. Amasaki, Aramaki, Ozawa, Kimura, Takano, Hashimoto, and Yamatani also performed as Disney Koe no Ōji-sama Voice Stars at the FNS Music Festival Summer on August 26, 2020.

In December 2020, a third installment was announced, starring Kent Ito, Keisuke Ueda, Wataru Urata, Motohiro Ota, Kurumu Okamiya, Ryohei Kimura, Nobunaga Shimazaki, Hiroki Nakada, Shugo Nakamura, Hiroki Miura, and Showtaro Morikubo. Kazuki Kato and Daisuke Namikawa were also credited as special guests. Their album, Disney Koe no Ōji-sama Voice Stars Dream Selection III, is slated for a release date of February 24, 2021.

Discography

Albums

Track Listing

Disney Date: Koe no Ōji-sama 

 Kamiya Hiroshi - "Kimi mo Toberu yo! (きみもとべるよ！; You Can Fly!)" (from Peter Pan)
 Suzumura Kenichi - "Whole New World (ホール・ニュー・ワールド)" (from Aladdin)
 Fukuyama Jun - "Bibbidi-Bobbidi-Boo (ビビディ・バビディ・ブー)" (from Cinderella)
 Sakurai Takahiro - "Hoshi ni Negai wo (星に願いを; When You Wish Upon a Star)" (from Pinocchio)
 Sugita Tomokazu - "Hitoashi Osaki ni (ひと足お先に; One Jump Ahead)" (from Aladdin)
 Midorikawa Hikaru - "Ai wo Kanjite (愛を感じて; Can You Feel the Love Tonight?)" (from The Lion King)
 Morikawa Toshiyuki - "Itsuka Yume de (いつか夢で; Once Upon a Dream)" (from Sleeping Beauty)
 Seki Tomokazu - "Go the Distance (ゴー・ザ・ディスタンス)" (from Hercules)
 Irino Miyu - "Under the Sea (アンダー・ザ・シー)" (from The Little Mermaid)
 Yamadera Koichi - "Circle of Life (サークル・オブ・ライフ)" (from The Lion King)
 All Participating Artists - "Micky Mouse March (ミッキーマウス・マーチ)" (from The Mickey Mouse Club) (Regular Edition Bonus Track)

Disney Koe no Ōji-sama Dai-ni Shō: Love Stories 
Disc 1
 Ishida Akira - (白雪姫 ―朗読― ; Snow White -Reading-) (from Snow White)
 Kamiya Hiroshi - (ハイ・ホー; Heigh-Ho) (from Snow White)
 Shimono Hiro - (キス・ザ・ガール ; Kiss the Girl) (from the Little Mermaid)
 Seki Tomokazu - (ユール・ビー・イン・マイ・ハート; You'll Be in My Heart) (from Tarzan)
 Sakurai Takahiro - (ララルー; Lalalu) (from Lady and the Tramp)
 Midorikawa Hikaru - (愛のうたごえ; Love is a Song) (from Bambi)
 Okiayu Ryoutarou - (ベラ・ノッテ; Bella Notte) (from Lady and the Tramp)
 Okamoto Nobuhiko - (いつでも一緒; Good Company) (from Oliver&Co)
 Yamadera Kouichi - (グレイト・スピリット; Great Spirit)
 Yamadera Kouichi - (塔の上のラプンツェル ―朗読―; Tangled -reading-)

Disc 2

 Tomokazu Seki & Ryutaro Okiayu - (美女と野獣; Beauty and the Beast) (from Beauty and the Beast)
 Hiro Shimono & Nobuhiko Okamoto - (ハクナ・マタタ; Hakuna Matata) (from The Lion King)
 Hikaru Midorikawa & Takahiro Sakurai - (輝く未来; I See the Light) (from Tangled)
 Kouichi Yamadera & Kouichi Yamadera - (みんなネコになりたいのさ; Everybody Wants to be a Cat) (from The Aristocats)
 Tomokazu Seki - karaoke version (美女と野獣; Beauty and the Beast) (from Beauty and the Beast)
 Hiro Shimono - karaoke version (ハクナ・マタタ; Hakuna Matata) (from The Lion King)
 Hikaru Midorikawa - karaoke version (輝く未来; I See the Light) (from Tangled)
 Kouichi Yamadera - karaoke version (みんなネコになりたいのさ; Everybody Wants to be a Cat) (from The Aristocats)
 Ryutaro Okiayu - karaoke version (美女と野獣; Beauty and the Beast) (from Beauty and the Beast)
 Nobuhiko Okamoto - karaoke version (ハクナ・マタタ; Hakuna Matata) (from The Lion King)
 Takahiro Sakurai - karaoke version (輝く未来; I See the Light) (from Tangled)
 Kouichi Yamadera - karaoke version (みんなネコになりたいのさ; Everybody Wants to be a Cat) (from The Aristocats)

Disney Koe no Ōji-sama: Tokyo Disney Resort 30 Shūnen Kinen Shū 
Disc 1:
 Yamadera Koichi - (Cinderella) (from Cinderella’s Fairy Tale Hall)
 Kamiya Hiroshi - (Aloha e Komomai) (from Lilo & Stitch)
 Ono Daisuke - (It’s so much fun)
 Terashima Takuma - (Chim Chim Cheery)
 Nakai Kazuya - (Winnie the Pooh) (from Pooh’s Hunny Hunt)
 Toriumi Kousuke - (Zip-A-Dee-Doo-Dah)
 Kaji Yuki - (Part of your world) (from The Little Mermaid)
 Suwabe Junichi - (Compass of your heart)

Disc 2:

 Kamiya Hiroshi & Kaji Yuki - (Magical Moment (Valentine’s Night))
 Suwabe Junichi & Midorikawa Hikaru (Minnie, oh! Minnie)
 Toriumi Kousuke & Okiayu Ryotaro (Swept Away)
 Ono Daisuke & Terashima Takuma (Dream goes on ~Magic Key)

Special Song in “Standard Edition”

 Midorikawa Hikaru & Okiayu Ryotaro (Kimi ga inai to (“If I Didn’t Have You” from Monsters, Inc. JP ver.))

Disney Koe no Ōji-sama All Stars 

 Hiroshi Kamiya - (Aloha E Komomai ~ Stitch Eisa) (from Enchanted Tiki Room: Stitch Presents "Aloha E Como Mai!)
 Jun Fukuyama- (Bibbidi Bobbidi Boo) (from Cinderella)
 Takuma Terashima - (Chim Chim Cheery) (from Castle Carousel)
 Yuki Kaji - (Part of Your World) (from Mermaid Lagoon)
 Miyu Irino - (Under the Sea) (from The Little Mermaid)
 Shimono Hiro - (Kiss the Girl) (from The Little Mermaid)
 Kenichi Suzumura - (Whole New World) (from Aladdin)
 Hikaru Midorikawa - (Song of love) (from Bambi)
 Tomoyuki Morikawa - (Someday in my dreams) (from Sleeping Beauty)
 Tomokazu Sugita - (One step ahead) (from Aladdin)
 Nobuhiko Okamoto - (Anytime Together (from Oliver New York Kitten Tale)
 Ryotaro Okiayu - (Bella Notte (from Lady and the Tramp)
 Kosuke Toriumi - (Zippa Dee Doo-Dah) (from Splash Mountain)
 Takahiro Sakurai - (Lalalou) (from Lady and the Tramp)
 Junichi Suwabe - (Compass of Your Heart) (from Sinbad Storybook Voyage)
 Daisuke Ono - (It's So Much Fun) (from Disney Halloween Street "Welcome to Spookyville")
 Tomokazu Seki - (You'll Be In My Heart) (from Tarzan)
 Koichi Yamadera - (Great Spirit) (from Brother Bear)
 Hiroshi Kamiya & Hikaru Midorikawa - (*Bonus track, Once Upon A Time ~ Tokyo Disneyland (R) Is Your Land) [Tokyo Disneyland (R)]

Disney Koe no Ōji-sama Voice Stars Dream Selection 

 Ishikawa Kaito - (君のようになりたい; I Wanna Be Like You)
 Satoshi Hino - (ひとりぼっちの晩餐会; Be Our Guest)
 Takuya Sato - (美女と野獣 / Beauty And The Beast)
 Tasuku Hatanaka - (Hakuna Matata)
 Natsuki Hanae - (Part Of Your World)
 Eguchi Takuya - (Under The Sea)
 Shunsuke Takeuchii - (Friend Like Me)
 Yuto Uemura - (A Whole New World)
 Tomoaki Maeno - (Go The Distance)
 Wataru Hatano - (君がいないと / If I Didn't Have You)
 Kensho Ono - (When She Loved Me)
 Daiki Yamashita - (Remember Me)
 Various Artists - Mickey Mouse March (All Star Ver.)

Disney Koe no Ōji-sama Voice Stars Dream Selection II 

 Shohei Hashimoto - (ハイ・ホー; Heigh Ho) (from Snow White)
 Subaru Kimura - (王様になるのが待ちきれない; I Just Can't Wait to be King) (from the Lion King)
 Taku Yashiro - (ハクナ・マタタ; Hakuna Matata) (from Lion King)　
 Akira Takano - (You'll Be in My Heart) (from Tarzan)
 Kouhei Amasaki - (ジッパ・ディー・ドゥー・ダー; Zip-a-Dee-Doo-Dah) (from Zip-a-Dee-Doo-Dah)
 Ren Ozawa - (アロハ・エ・コモ・マイ; Aloha E Komomai) (from Lilo & Stitch: The Series)
 Yoshihiko Aramaki - (アンダー・ザー・シー; Under the Sea) (from the Little Mermaid)　
 Shinnosuke Tachibana - (自由への扉; When Will My Life Begin) (from Tangled)
 Yoshitaka Yamaya - (輝く未来; I See the Light) (from Tangled)
 Shintaro Asanuma - (そばにいて ; So Close) (from Enchanted)　
 Toshiki Masuda - (生まれてはじめて; For the First Time in Forever) (from Frozen)
 Makoto Furukawa - (星に願いを; When You Wish Upon a Star) (from Pinocchio)　
 ALL CAST - (みんなスター; We're All in This Together) (from High School Musical)

Disney Koe no Ōji-sama Voice Stars Dream Selection III 

 Kimura Ryohei - (Arabian Nights Legend of the Lamp -Recitation) (from Aladdin)
 Urata Wataru - (One Jump Ahead) (from Aladdin)
 Nakada Hiroki - (A Whole New World) (from Aladdin)
 Shimasaki Nobunaga - (Compass of Your Heart) (from Sindbad Storybook Voyage)
 Ota Motohiro - (How Far I’ll Go) (from Moana)
 Nakamura Shugo - (Under the Sea (from The Little Mermaid)
 Morikubo Showtaro - (Poor Unfortunate Soul) (from The Little Mermaid)
 Ito Kent - (Out There) (from The Hunchback of Notre Dame)
 Ueda Keisuke - (Something There) (from Beauty and the Beast)
 Okamiya Kurumu - (Can You Feel the Love Tonight) (from The Lion King)
 Miura Hiroki - (Speechless) (from Aladdin)
 Namikawa Daisuke - (Heracles -Recitation-) (from Hercules)
 Kato Kazuki - (Go the Distance) (from Hercules)
 ALL CAST - (It’s a Small World) (from New York World’s Fair)
 ALL CAST - (Mickey Mouse March) (from Mickey Mouse Club)

References

External links
 

Avex Group artists
Cover bands
Disney music
Musical groups established in 2012
Musical groups from Tokyo
2012 establishments in Japan